Wave on Wave is the second studio album released by American country music artist Pat Green. Released in 2003 on Universal/Republic Records in association with Mercury Records, it produced two singles for Green on the Billboard country charts. The title track, the first of these two singles, became Green's highest charting single, peaking at No. 3 on the country charts, while "A Guy Like Me" reached No. 31. Wave on Wave has been certified gold by the RIAA.

Track listing

Personnel
As listed in liner notes.

The Pat Green Band
 Pat Green - lead vocals, acoustic guitar, background vocals
 Brendon Anthony - violin
 Brett Danaher - electric guitar,  baritone guitar, banjo
 Jondan McBride - acoustic guitar, 12-string guitar, tenor guitar, mandolin, harmony vocals
 David Neuhauser - electric guitar, acoustic guitar, baritone guitar, slide guitar, piano, Hammond B-3 organ, Wurlitzer
 Justin Pollard - drums, percussion
 Michael Tarabay - bass guitar

Special guest appearances
 Ray Benson - vocals on "Elvis"
 John Carroll - electric guitar on "Elvis"
 Chad Cromwell - drums on "Wave on Wave"
 Mike Daly - steel guitar, dobro
 Ray Wylie Hubbard - duet vocals and acoustic guitar on "If I was the Devil"
 John Jarvis - piano on "Wave on Wave"
 Trish Murphy - vocals on "Elvis"
 Willie Nelson - vocals on "Elvis"
 Sasha Ostrovsky - steel guitar on "Wave on Wave"
 Waylon Payne - acoustic guitar and vocals on "Elvis", duet vocals on "Sing 'Til I Can't Stop Crying"
 Brent Rowan - electric guitar on "Wave on Wave"
 Walt Wilkins - acoustic guitar and background vocals on "Wrapped"
 Curtis Wright - background vocals on "Wave on Wave"

Chart performance

Weekly charts

Year-end charts

Certifications

References

2003 albums
Pat Green albums
Albums produced by Don Gehman
Albums produced by Tony Brown (record producer)
Show Dog-Universal Music albums